Barfing in the Backseat: How I Survived My Family Road Trip is the twelfth book in the Hank Zipzer children's book series by Henry Winkler and Lin Oliver.

Plot summary
In this story, the Zipzers take a road trip to a crossword puzzle tournament and a roller coaster park in North Carolina. But when he mistakenly leaves Mrs. Adolf's vacation homework packet at a motel, he and Frankie set out to have it delivered — without Mr. Zipzer finding out.

References

External links
Official website

2007 American novels
American children's novels
Novels set in North Carolina
2007 children's books